Peter Czerwinski (born Piotr Czerwinski; November 30, 1985), better known by his stage name Furious Pete, is a Canadian competitive eater and YouTube personality. Czerwinski currently holds fourteen Guinness World Records in eating.

Early life and career
Peter Czerwinski was born November 30, 1985, in Toronto. Both his parents had health issues. As a teenager, he battled against anorexia and was hospitalized at Toronto's The Hospital for Sick Children. Bodybuilding was a major factor in his recovery.

Czerwinski has a slower digestion rate than the average person's.  His daily diet comprises nine balanced meals and he exercises daily. Czerwinski became aware of his talent in eating after managing to beat an eating record. Thereafter, he decided to take on more eating-related challenges and post them on YouTube. Having participated in more than 90 eating competitions, Czerwinski holds fourteen Guinness World Records in competitive eating, including that for eating a whole raw onion in 43.53 seconds, seventeen bananas in 2 minutes, fifteen hamburgers in 10 minutes, 750 millilitres of olive oil in 60 seconds, and 17 Jaffa Cakes in sixty seconds. He also participated in season one of Canada's Got Talent. For his performance, he ate 5 hard boiled eggs, 3 pieces of Canadian bacon, 2 bananas, and a bag of milk in 51 seconds; however, he did not make it past the Toronto Auditions.

A direct-to-DVD documentary film, The Story of Furious Pete, chronicling Czerwinski's life, screened at the Hot Docs Canadian International Documentary Festival. The Furious "Pete" – which consists of 20 pieces of bacon and 20 pieces of cheese, alongside a five-pound platter of fries – is named after him, after Czerwinski became the first person in 1,500 attempts to finish it.

Health
Czerwinski has successfully battled testicular cancer twice in the past, both times going into remission. On February 16, 2017 he uploaded a video onto YouTube where he stated he was yet again battling cancer and it was testicular cancer, making this his third time fighting. In January 2019, Czerwinski stated that the testicular cancer returned and had his second testicle surgically removed, requiring him to undergo testosterone replacement therapy for the rest of his life.

See also
 List of competitive eaters

References

External links

 

1985 births
Living people
Canadian bodybuilders
Canadian YouTubers
Canadian people of Polish descent